Kinga Achruk, née Byzdra (born 9 January 1989) is a Polish handball player for MKS Lublin.

She represented the Polish national team at the 2013 World Women's Handball Championship in Serbia and the 2015 World Women's Handball Championship in Denmark.

Achievements
EHF Champions League:
Winner: 2015
Finalist: 2014
Carpathian Trophy:
Winner: 2017

References

External links
Player profile at the Polish Handball Association website 

Polish female handball players
1989 births
Living people
People from Puławy
Sportspeople from Lublin Voivodeship
Expatriate handball players